Spilarctia transversa is a moth in the family Erebidae. It was described by Rob de Vos and Daawia Suhartawan in 2011. It is found in Papua New Guinea and Papua, where it seems to be restricted to the  Central Mountain Range.

References

Moths described in 2011
transversa